Stará Červená Voda is a municipality and village in Jeseník District in the Olomouc Region of the Czech Republic. It has about 600 inhabitants. It is located on the border with Poland.

Administrative parts
The village of Nová Červená Voda is an administrative part of Stará Červená Voda.

History
The first written mention of Stará Červená Voda is from 1291, in a deed which described the situation in 1266. It was then part of the Duchy of Nysa within fragmented Piast-ruled Poland. Later on, along with the Duchy of Nysa, it passed under Bohemian suzerainty, and following the duchy's dissolution in 1850, it was incorporated directly into Bohemia. Following World War I, from 1918, it formed part of Czechoslovakia.

From 1938 to 1945 the village was occupied by Germany. It was the base for a German-operated working party (E433) of British and Commonwealth prisoners of war, under the administration of the Stalag VIII-B/344 prisoner-of-war camp at Łambinowice. In January 1945, as the Soviet armies resumed their offensive and advanced into German-occupied territories, the prisoners were marched by the Germans westward in the Long March. Many of them died, rest of them was liberated by the allied armies after some four months of travelling on foot.

References

External links

Villages in Jeseník District
Czech Silesia